Cavity may refer to:

Biology and healthcare
Body cavity, a fluid-filled space in many animals where organs typically develop
Gastrovascular cavity, the primary organ of digestion and circulation in cnidarians and flatworms
Dental cavity or tooth decay, damage to the structure of a tooth
Lung cavity, an air-filled space within the lung

Radio frequency resonance
 Microwave cavity or RF cavity, a cavity resonator in the radio frequency range, for example used in particle accelerators
 Optical cavity, the cavity resonator of a laser
 Resonant cavity, a device designed to select for waves of particular wavelengths

Other uses
Cavity (band), a sludge metal band from Miami, Florida
Cavity method, a mathematical method  to solve some mean field type of models
Cavity wall, a wall consisting of two skins with a cavity

See also
 Cavitation, the phenomenon of partial vacuums forming in fluid, for example, in propellers
 Cavitary pneumonia, a type of pneumonia in which a hole is formed in the lung
 Cavity Search (disambiguation)
 Hollow (disambiguation)